is a Shinto shrine in Chizu, Tottori Prefecture, Japan. Known from the time of the Mongol invasions, the shrine is celebrated for its Zelkova and momiji. The Honden dates to 1832. The Onbashira Festival, held in the Year of the Tiger and Year of the Rooster, sees pillars of Japanese cedar carried through the town.

See also

 Suwa Shrine (disambiguation)
 Suwa Taisha
 Matsuri

References

Suwa shrines
Shinto shrines in Tottori Prefecture